Katherine Edwards  may refer to:

Katherine Edwards Middle School California
Cate Edwards, daughter of John Edwards
Cathy Edwards (politician), Australian politician

See also
Edwards (surname)